The Sopwith 7F.1 Snipe was a British single-seat biplane fighter of the Royal Air Force (RAF). It was designed and built by the Sopwith Aviation Company during the First World War, and came into squadron service a few weeks before the end of the conflict, in late 1918.

The Snipe was not a fast aircraft by the standards of its time, but its excellent climb and manoeuvrability made it a good match for contemporary German fighters.

It was selected as the standard postwar single-seat RAF fighter and the last examples were not retired until 1926.

Design and development
In April 1917, Herbert Smith, the chief designer of the Sopwith Company, began to design a fighter intended to be the replacement for Sopwith's most famous aeroplane, the Sopwith Camel. The design, called Snipe by Sopwith, was in its initial form a single-bay biplane, slightly smaller than the Camel and intended to be powered by similar engines. The pilot sat higher than in the Camel while the centre-section of the upper wing was uncovered, giving a better view from the cockpit. Armament was to be two Vickers machine guns. In the absence of an official order, Sopwith began construction of two prototypes as a private venture in September 1917. This took advantage of a licence that had been granted to allow construction of four Sopwith Rhino bomber prototypes, only two of which were built. The first prototype Snipe, powered by a Bentley AR.1 rotary engine was completed in October 1917.

The second prototype was completed with the new, more powerful Bentley BR.2, engine, which gave  in November 1917. This promised better performance and prompted an official contract for six prototypes to be placed, including the two aircraft built as private ventures. The third prototype to fly, serial number B9965, had modified wings, with a wider centre-section and a smaller cut-out for the pilot, while the fuselage had a fully circular section, rather than the slab-sided one of the first two aircraft and the tail was smaller. This allowed the Snipe to compete for Air Board Specification A.1(a) for a high-altitude single-seat fighter. An oxygen supply and heated clothing were to be provided for the pilot to aid operation at high altitude. The Snipe was tested against three other fighter prototypes, all powered by the Bentley BR.2 engine: the Austin Osprey triplane, the Boulton & Paul Bobolink and the Nieuport B.N.1. While there was little difference in performance between the aircraft, the Sopwith was selected for production, with orders for 1,700 Snipes placed in March 1918.

The Snipe's structure was heavier but much stronger than earlier Sopwith fighters. Although not a fast aircraft for 1918, it was very manoeuvrable and much easier to handle than the Camel, with a superior view from the cockpit - especially forwards and upwards. The Snipe also had a superior rate of climb and much better high-altitude performance compared with its predecessor, allowing it to fight Germany's newer fighters on more equal terms. Further modifications were made to the Snipe during the war and postwar. The Snipe was built around the Bentley BR2 engine - the last rotary to be used by the RAF. Its fixed armament consisted of two 0.303 in (7.7 mm) Vickers machine guns on the cowling and it was also able to carry up to four  bombs for ground attack work, identical to the Camel's armament. The design allowed for a Lewis gun to be mounted on the centre section in a similar manner to those carried by the Dolphin - in the event this was not fitted to production aircraft.

Production began in 1918, with more than 4,500 being ordered. Production ended in 1919, with just under 500 being built, the rest being cancelled due to the end of the war. There was only one variant, the Snipe I, with production by several companies including Sopwith, Boulton & Paul Ltd, Coventry Ordnance Works, D. Napier & Son, Nieuport and Ruston, Proctor and Company. Two aircraft were re-engined with a  ABC Dragonfly radial engine and these entered production as the Sopwith Dragon. An armoured version entered production as the Sopwith Salamander.

Operational history

First World War

In March 1918, an example was evaluated by No.1 Aeroplane Supply Depot (No.1 ASD) at St-Omer in France. Lieutenant L. N. Hollinghurst (later an ace in Sopwith Dolphins, and an air chief marshal) flew to 24,000 ft in 45 minutes. He stated that the aircraft was tail heavy and had "a very poor rudder", but that otherwise manoeuvrability was good.

The first squadron to equip with the new fighter was No. 43 Squadron, based at Fienvillers in France, which replaced its Camels with 15 Snipes on 30 August 1918. After spending much of September training, it flew its first operational patrols equipped with the Snipe on 24 September. The Snipe also saw service with No. 4 Squadron Australian Flying Corps (AFC) from October 1918. While 43 Squadron's Snipes saw relatively little combat, the Australians had more success, claiming five victories on 26 October and six on 28 October, while on 29 October, 4 Squadron claimed eight Fokker D.VIIs destroyed and two more driven down out of control for the loss of one of 15 Snipes. No. 208 Squadron RAF converted from Camels in November, too late for the Snipes to see action.

One of the most famous incidents in which the Snipe was involved occurred on 27 October 1918 when Canadian Major William Barker attached to No. 201 Squadron RAF flew over the Forêt de Mormal in France. Barker's Snipe (No. E8102) had been brought with him for personal evaluation purposes in connection with his UK-based training duties and was therefore operationally a "one-off". The engagement with enemy aircraft occurred at the end of a two-week posting to renew his combat experience as Barker was returning to the UK. While on his last operation over the battlefields of France, he attacked a two-seater German aircraft and swiftly shot it down. However, he was soon attacked by a formation of at least 15 Fokker D.VIIs, an aircraft widely considered to be the best operational German fighter of the First World War. The ensuing melee was observed by many Allied troops. In the engagement, he was wounded three times, twice losing consciousness momentarily, but managing to shoot down at least three D.VIIs before making a forced landing on the Allied front lines. Barker was awarded the Victoria Cross for this action.  The fuselage of this Snipe is preserved at the Canadian War Museum, Ottawa, Ontario.

Postwar operations
Following the Armistice with Germany that ended the First World War, Sopwith Snipes formed part of the British Army of Occupation, returning to the United Kingdom in August/September 1919, while Snipes replaced Camels in four home defence squadrons based in the United Kingdom. This force was quickly run down, however, and by the end of 1919, only a single squadron, No 80 was equipped with the Snipe.

In 1919, the Snipe took part in the Allied intervention on the side of the White Russians during the Russian Civil War against the Bolsheviks, twelve Snipes being used by the RAF mission in north Russia. At least one of the RAF Snipes was captured by the Bolsheviks and pressed into service.

Although the performance demonstrated by the Snipe was unimpressive (tests at Martlesham Heath in October 1918 had shown that the Snipe was inferior to the Martinsyde F.3 and Fokker D.VII), it was selected as the standard postwar single-seat fighter of the RAF almost by default, with the Martinsyde Buzzard development of the F.3 being 25 percent more expensive than the Snipe and relying on a French engine that was in short supply (the 300 hp Hispano-Suiza 8), while the range of fighters powered by the ABC Dragonfly radial engine did not come to fruition owing to failure of that engine. The last Snipes were retired by that service in 1926.

The Canadian Air Force (CAF) operated the Snipe after the war, but it was phased out in 1923, a year before the Royal Canadian Air Force (RCAF) was formed.

Operators

 Australian Flying Corps
 No. 4 Squadron AFC in France.
 No. 5 (Training) Squadron AFC in the United Kingdom.
 No. 8 (Training) Squadron AFC in the United Kingdom.

 Brazilian Naval Aviation  operated 12 Snipes.

 Canadian Air Force
 No. 1 Squadron RCAF

 Soviet Air Force - Postwar.

 Royal Flying Corps / Royal Air Force

 No. 1 Squadron RAF
 No. 3 Squadron RAF
 No. 17 Squadron RAF
 No. 19 Squadron RAF
 No. 23 Squadron RAF
 No. 25 Squadron RAF
 No. 29 Squadron RAF
 No. 32 Squadron RAF
 No. 37 Squadron RAF
 No. 41 Squadron RAF
 No. 43 Squadron RAF

 No. 45 Squadron RAF
 No. 56 Squadron RAF
 No. 70 Squadron RAF
 No. 78 Squadron RAF
 No. 80 Squadron RAF
 No. 81 Squadron RAF
 No. 111 Squadron RAF
 No. 112 Squadron RAF
 No. 143 Squadron RAF
 No. 201 Squadron RAF
 No. 208 Squadron RAF

Survivors and reproductions

Two complete, original, Sopwith Snipes survive.
E6938 is displayed in the Canada Aviation and Space Museum in Ottawa. Formerly owned by film star Reginald Denny, it was restored in the 1960s.
E8105 is exhibited at the National Air and Space Museum in Washington, D.C. Previously, it had been at the Old Rhinebeck Aerodrome, in Rhinebeck, New York. It passed to the NASM after Cole Palen's death in December 1993.
The fuselage (minus landing gear, engine and cowl) of Major William G. Barker's Snipe, E8102 is on display at the Canadian War Museum, Ottawa.

Reproductions
Antique Aero in California has completed construction of an airworthy, very detailed reproduction Sopwith Snipe. It awaits a new-build 230 h.p. Bentley B.R.2 engine.

Another Snipe reproduction marked as E8102 was built in New Zealand by The Vintage Aviator Ltd., and was subsequently purchased by Kermit Weeks for his Fantasy of Flight aviation museum in Polk City, Florida. This is airworthy and uses an original Bentley rotary engine.

The RAF Museum in August 2012 took delivery of a static display reproduction of the Snipe. Marked E6655, it was constructed in the Wellington workshops of The Vintage Aviator Ltd. in New Zealand. The inclusion of original, non-airworthy parts precludes this aircraft from flight status.

The first reproduction was built by Richard Lincoln Day of Colonia, NJ. This Snipe, marked as E6837, flew for one summer at the Old Rhinebeck Aerodrome, in Rhinebeck, NY before being purchased by Doug Champlin for his collection in Mesa, Arizona. This collection was later donated to the Museum of Flight in Seattle, Washington.

Tyabb Airport in Victoria, Australia, hosts a reproduction snipe VH-SNP E8050. The aircraft first flew on the 17th of October 2014, and is powered by a W670 Radial. This snipe has since been relocated to the RAAF Museum in Point Cook, Victoria

Specifications (Snipe)

See also

References

Notes

Citations

Bibliography
 Bruce, J. M. The Aeroplanes of the Royal Flying Corps (Military Wing). London: Putnam, 1982. .
 Bruce, J. M. British Aeroplanes 1914–18. London: Putnam, 1957.
 Bruce, J. M. "Sopwith Snipe...the RAF's first fighter: Part 1". Air Enthusiast International, April 1974, Vol 6 No 4. Bromley, Kent, UK: Fine Scroll. pp. 190–195, 206–207.
 Bruce, J. M. "Sopwith Snipe...the RAF's first fighter: Part 2". Air Enthusiast International, June 1974, Vol 6 No 6. Bromley, Kent, UK: Fine Scroll. pp. 289–299.
 Davis, Mick. Sopwith Aircraft. Ramsbury, Malborough, UK: The Crowood Press, 1999. .
 Franks, Norman. Dolphin and Snipe Aces of World War I (Aircraft of the Aces). London: Osprey Publishing, 2002. .
 Halley, James J. The Squadrons of the Royal Air Force. Tonbrige, Kent, UK: Air Britain (Historians), 1980. .
 "Honours: Two More VCs". Flight, 5 December 1918, Vol X No 49. p. 1369.
 Lumsden, Alec. "On Silver Wings: Part 1". Aeroplane Monthly, October 1990, Vol 18 No 10. London:IPC. ISSN 0143-7240. pp. 586–592.
 Mason, Francis K. The British Fighter since 1912. Annapolis, Maryland: Naval Institute Press, 1992. .
 Robertson, Bruce. Sopwith–The Man and His Aircraft. Letchworth, UK: Air Review, 1970. .
 Thetford, Owen. "On Silver Wings: Part 2". Aeroplane Monthly, November 1990, Vol 18 No 11. London:IPC. ISSN 0143-7240. pp. 664–670.

External links
 2018 checkout flight by Kermit Weeks, of his Fantasy of Flight New Zealand-built, rotary-powered Sopwith Snipe reproduction example

1910s British fighter aircraft
Military aircraft of World War I
Snipe
Aircraft first flown in 1917
Single-engined tractor aircraft
Biplanes
Rotary-engined aircraft